Jahanara Kajjan (15 February 1915 – December 1945), or "Miss Kajjan", was an Indian singer and actress active during the 1920s and 1930s, often referred to as the "Nightingale of Bengal". 
The reigning queen of early talkie movies glamorous movie sensation the trained classical singer, the fashion icon and the trendsetter, Jahanara Kajjan she was known as "Lark of Hindi Cinema" and the "Beautiful Nightingale of Bengal Screen". She along with Master Nissar made most sought after and popular singing pair of the stage and film.

Life

Born on 15 February 1915 to Suggan begum of Lucknow who was very famous for her beauty and singing capabilities and the Nawab chammi Saheb of Bhagalpur. Kajjan received education at home and learnt English. Well versed in Urdu literature, she wrote poetry under pseudonym “Ada”she received  training in Hindustani classical music from Ustad Hussain Khan of Patna. She was hired by a theatre company at Patna. Then. She joined Alfred Company owned by Madan Theatres of Calcutta. Kajjan attained name and fame as a very popular singer and actor of the stage.

The advent of talkies in 1931 brought a revolution in Film industry Madan Theatre of Calcutta, “Shirin Farhaad” based on the stage play scripted by the renowned playwright Agha Hashar Kashmiri. It featured 42 songs by Kajjan and Nissar, already popular singing pair of the stage. The film got overwhelmed success across India with Kajjan emerging as the first superstar of Hindi cinema then came another super hit “Laila Majnu”, followed by “Indrasabha” based on the play written by Agha Hasan Amanat, it  had 71 songs, the film still holds the world record as “film with most songs”. The film with duration of three and half hours was entirely in verse and Kajjan sang several songs, it became a blockbuster..
. Some of her other memorable movies were “Bilwamangal”, “Shakuntala”, “Alibaba aur Chalis Chor”, “Aankh ka Nasha”, “Zehari Saanp”, etc.

By mid 1936 her relation with seth Karnani owner of Madan theatre deteriorated and she left Madan theatres and she had to face a legal case by Karnani which ruined her she had to sell her mansion in Calcutta and all of her property so she left calcutta in early 1938 and Made her own Thaetrical company Jahanara theatrical company and decided to present her famous old shows with less duration and some new settings, she spent 60,000 rupees in those days on a stage project and started doing shows in all over India started from lahore, Amritsar, multan, Delhi and Bombay but her health started to fall so she along with her Mother Suggan bai had to settle in Bombay and started working in bombay film Industry  Kajjan's career in Bombay was short-lived from 1941 to 1944, during which she appeared in seven films mostly of Ranjit films, sunrise pictures and Minerva films none of them made big for Kajjan with the exception of Sohrab Modi's “Prithvi Vallabh” in which she was given a character role Further, she was given character roles so she could not made it big in Bombay.
Her films in Bombay were Ghar Sansar, Suhagan, Bharuthari, Prarthna, Merchant of Venice and her last was Ranjit films Mumtaz Mahal in which she played Empress Noor Jahan. 
She lived a lavish life at Calcutta. 
She even had two tiger cubs as pets.  Kajjan had learnt western dancing and was a regular visitor to Calcutta Club, it is said that she was intimately involved with Najmul Hassan, a popular Star in 1930s.
She died of Cancer in late December 1945 at a young age of 30.
Starting her career from stage, she moved to films, joining J. J. Madan's Madan Theatres.  
Two of her early Talkies becoming instant hits, Shirin Farhad (1931) and Laila Majnu (1931) both Madan Theatre productions. Her co-star in the two films was Master Nissar and the duo became popular singing sensations, with Kajjan being known as "the lark of India". Her mother was a "tawaif" with important connections. Jehanara was educated at home, where she learned English and Urdu; she wrote poetry, some of which was published. She received a classical music training from Ustad Hussain Khan. She began appearing on stage in the years when women were first allowed to perform in the Indian theatre.

Aside from acting, she and Ghulam Mohammed also taught Noor Jehan when the latter was young, making her do riyaz up to 12 hours each day. Kajjan stopped singing in 1930, however, she continued to star in movies such as Shirin Farhad and Layla Majnun opposite Nissar, becoming a symbol of on-screen romance in the cinema of India.

Notable films
Shirin Farhad (1931), the second Indian Talkie to be made, was released two months after the landmark Alam Ara, which released on 11 March 1931. The story centred on a folk-legend from the Shahnama, and was already a success on the Parsi stage. J. J. Madan adapted it to film form with Master Nissar and Kajjan playing the lead roles. According to author Gooptu, the film "created a box-office record". It was "twice as successful" compared to Alam Ara, and had 17 (out of the 18) songs sung by Jehanara Kajjan and Master Nisaar.

Laila Majnu (1931)

Indrasabha (1932)

Bilwamangal (1933)

Sakhi Lutera (1934)

Zehri Saanp (1934)

Shaitan Ka Pash (1935)

Rasheeda (1935)

Manorma (1936)

Regeneration (1936)

Mera Pyara (1936)

Death
Kajjan died in 1945 in Bombay, Maharashtra, India.

Songs
Kahe neha lagaye sajania 
tumhare darshan ko naina 
Ek dhundla sa mohabat ka hai naqsha
Aya sawan aja sajan
Kookat koyalia

Films
Shirin Farhad (1931)
Laila Majnu (1931)
Zalim Saudagar (1941)Prarthana (1943)Prithvi Vallabh'' (1943)

References

Sources

External links
 Indian Cinema Database at the University of Pennsylvania.

1915 births
1945 deaths
20th-century Indian women singers
20th-century Indian singers
20th-century Indian actresses